Jacques-Olivier Bureau (February 6, 1820 – February 7, 1883) was a Quebec notary and political figure. He was a Liberal member of the Senate of Canada for De Lorimier division from 1867 to 1883.

He was born in Trois-Rivières, Lower Canada in 1820 and studied there and at the Séminaire de Nicolet. He qualified as a notary in 1843 and practiced at Saint-Rémi and Montreal. In 1854, he was elected to the Legislative Assembly of the Province of Canada for Napierville; he was reelected in 1858 and 1861. In 1862, he was elected to the Legislative Council in Lorimier division. Bureau was active in promoting the abolition of seigneurial tenure in Canada East. He was named provincial secretary in 1863, a cabinet post; as a result, he had to run again (successfully) for his seat in the legislative council. After Confederation, he was named to the Senate.

He died at Saint-Rémi in 1883.

References

 
 
 The Canadian parliamentary companion, HJ Morgan (1874)

External links
 

1820 births
1883 deaths
Members of the Legislative Assembly of the Province of Canada from Canada East
Members of the Legislative Council of the Province of Canada
Canadian senators from Quebec